Cell were a New York-based rock band. They were often labeled as a grunge band due to the time frame of their existence, though they could be considered college rock or alternative rock.  The band formed in 1990 and disbanded in 1995.  Championed by Sonic Youth's Thurston Moore, they released a 7 inch on his Ecstatic Peace label, and later signed to Geffen.

Members
Ian James (vocals, guitar)
Jerry DiRienzo (vocals, guitar)
David Motamed (bass)
Keith Nealy (drums)

Discography

Slo*Blo (1992)

Track listing
 "Fall"  (3:34)
 "Wild" (3:46)
 "Cross the River" (2:56)
 "Dig Deep"  (3:29)
 "Stratosphere"   (5:35)
 "Two"    (2:58)
 "Everything Turns"   (4:11)
 "Tundra"   (3:06)
 "Bad Day"    (2:24)
 "Hills"    (4:08)

Living Room (1994)

Track listing
 "Milky"  (3:22)
 "China Latina" (3:36)
 "Sad & Beautiful" (4:04)
 "Goodbye"  (3:38)
 "Chained"   (3:18)
 "So Cool" (LP-Only)
 "Come Around"    (3:32)
 "Living Room"   (4:42)
 "Fly"   (4:05)
 "Halo"  (3:04)
 "Soft Ground"  (4:44)
 "Camera" (4:08)
 "Blue Star" (6:22)

References

External links
Trouserpress entry for Cell
[ Cell at AMG]

1995 disestablishments in New York (state)
Musical groups established in 1990
Musical groups disestablished in 1995
Alternative rock groups from New York (state)
1990 establishments in New York City
Geffen Records artists
Musical quartets